The Bashan Dam is an embankment dam on the Renhe River located  northwest of Chengkou County's seat in Chongqing, China. The primary purpose of the dam is hydroelectric power generation and it supports a 140 MW power station containing two 70 MW Pelton turbinegenerators. Construction on the project began in 2005, the river was diverted by 2006 and the generators operational in 2009.

See also

List of dams and reservoirs in China
List of major power stations in Chongqing

References

Dams in China
Hydroelectric power stations in Chongqing
Concrete-face rock-fill dams
Dams completed in 2009